Below are lists of schools in Victoria, Australia:

List of government schools in Victoria, Australia
List of non-government schools in Victoria, Australia

Largest Victorian schools
Based on enrolment size, this is a list of 50 of the largest schools in Victoria, Australia.

See also
Light Timber Construction schools
List of schools in Australia
List of high schools in Victoria

References

External links
Schools Online listing
Schools and Studies Search - VCAA website
Search all Victorian schools

Schools